John Evan Dapcevich (September 26, 1926 – September 1, 2022) was an American politician in the state of Alaska.

Dapcevich was born in Hazleton, Pennsylvania, in 1926 to Sam and Stana Dapcevich, immigrants from Montenegro, where his father worked in coal mines. The family moved to Juneau, Alaska, in 1928 living with a Serbian community, with John entering school years later. He moved to Sitka, Alaska, in 1960 where he served six terms as Mayor during a span of 20 years. During his time in office, Dapcevich worked to successfully unify the City of Sitka with various borough governments. Upon his retirement in 1995, he moved back to Juneau.

He also served in the Alaska Public Offices Commission and Alaska Pioneers' Homes Advisory Board, serving under Governor Steve Cowper. In addition, he previously served in the Territorial Teachers' Retirement System and as a budget analyst in the territory's fiscal and budget management office. Dapcevich also chaired the Southeast Alaska Democratic Party and the State Central Council of the Alaska Democratic Party. He was awarded a lifetime achievement award by Governor Tony Knowles in 2003. He was married to Janice and resided in Juneau until his death in September 2022.

Notes

References

1926 births
2022 deaths
Alaska Democrats
Alaska Territory officials
American people of Montenegrin descent
American people of Serbian descent
Mayors of Sitka, Alaska
People from Hazleton, Pennsylvania
Politicians from Juneau, Alaska
State political party chairs of Alaska